The locust finch or locustfinch (Paludipasser locustella) is a species of waxbill found in south-central and south-eastern Africa. It is the only species in the genus Paludipasser.  It is sometimes placed in the genus Ortygospiza.

Taxonomy
Zambia. Neave placed in the monotypic genus Paludipasser within the waxbill family Estrildidae but it has been placed in the same genus as the quailfinch, Ortygospiza.

Description
The locust finch is similar to the quailfinch but males have a red face, throat and breast with rufous wings and black body with white spots but with a plain back belly. The females also have rufous wings and lack the white face markings of female quailfinches while immatures have black and brown streaks on the upperparts and browner underparts than females.

Distribution and habitat
The locust finch has been recorded in south-east Cameroon, Republic of Congo, the Democratic Republic of Congo south through Zambia, Angola, Tanzania, Malawi, Mozambique, Zimbabwe and Botswana. In Botswana, Zimbabwe and Mozambique this is a rather rare species. There are unconfirmed reports of at least two pairs breeding on the Jos Plateau of northern Nigeria, this would be a very significant range extension for this species. The preferred habitat is damp, thinly vegetated patches within grasslands close to water in sandy spoild areas, like sandveld.

Biology
The locust finch is a terrestrial species and perching is almost unknown. Its preferred habitat as prone to drying out in the dry season and at these times these birds can be nomadic. They are normally encountered in pairs but when drought conditions are severe they can gather in small flock of up to 10 birds. In southern Africa eggs are laid from January to May, i.e. during the rainy season with most egg laying at the height of the rainy season in January and February. This is a difficult species to locate due to its terrestrial habits and tendency to flyy long distances when flushed, like a quail.

Threats
The locust finch was previously listed as near threatened. However, due to lack of information, it was suggested that it remains widespread and locally common, and there is no evidence of significant declines. The population of this species may have declined for the past few decades due to a series of droughts in the 1980s. It is threatened by the cage-bird trade and loss of marshland habitat, partly due to dry periods.

References

locust finch
Birds of Central Africa
Birds of Southern Africa
locust finch